The first government of Israel formed by David Ben-Gurion on 8 March 1949, a month and a half after the elections for the first Knesset. His Mapai party formed a coalition with the United Religious Front, the Progressive Party, the Sephardim and Oriental Communities and the Democratic List of Nazareth, and there were 12 ministers.

A notable piece of legislation enacted during the term of the first government was an educational law in 1949 which introduced compulsory schooling for all children between the ages of 5 to 14.

Ben-Gurion resigned on 15 October 1950 after the United Religious Front objected to his demands that the Supply and Rationing Ministry be closed and a businessman appointed as Minister for Trade and Industry, as well as issues over education in the new immigrant camps.

References

External links
Knesset 1: Government 1 Knesset website

 01
1949 establishments in Israel
1950 disestablishments in Israel
Cabinets established in 1949
Cabinets disestablished in 1950
1949 in Israeli politics
1950 in Israeli politics
1940s in Israeli politics
 01